Samir Merzić (born 29 June 1984) is a Bosnian former professional footballer who played as a defender. He has played four times for the Bosnia and Herzegovina national team. He played in the Gambrinus liga for FK Teplice.

International career
Merzić made his debut for Bosnia and Herzegovina in an October 2007 European Championship qualification match away against Greece and has earned a total of four caps. His final international was a January 2008 friendly match against Japan.

References

External links
 
 

1984 births
Living people
Sportspeople from Mostar
Association football fullbacks
Bosnia and Herzegovina footballers
Bosnia and Herzegovina international footballers
FK Velež Mostar players
FK Ústí nad Labem players
FK Teplice players
FK Senica players
FC Amkar Perm players
IL Stjørdals-Blink players
FK Sloboda Tuzla players
First League of the Federation of Bosnia and Herzegovina players
Czech National Football League players
Czech First League players
Slovak Super Liga players
Russian Premier League players
Premier League of Bosnia and Herzegovina players
Norwegian Second Division players
Bosnia and Herzegovina expatriate footballers
Expatriate footballers in the Czech Republic
Bosnia and Herzegovina expatriate sportspeople in the Czech Republic
Expatriate footballers in Slovakia
Bosnia and Herzegovina expatriate sportspeople in Slovakia
Expatriate footballers in Russia
Bosnia and Herzegovina expatriate sportspeople in Russia
Expatriate footballers in Norway
Bosnia and Herzegovina expatriate sportspeople in Norway